Omar Agha was the Dey of the Deylik of Algiers from April 1815 to September 1817, after the assassination of his predecessor Mohamed Kharnadji on 7 April 1815, who had been in office for only 17 days.

Early life 
He was born on the island of Lesbos. His name was Omar ben Mohammed. He left for Algiers at an unknown date, and first became a privateer, then a janissary. He soon became Agha of the Odjak of Algiers.

Rule 
He launched a war against Tunis, and led the attacks of Barbary privateers on American ships. An expedition of the US Navy led by Commodore Stephen Decatur in command of a squadron of nine ships, was conducted in 1815 against the Regency of Algiers. The episode is known as the Second Barbary War. The operation forced Dey Omar to sign a treaty ending attacks of piracy, a treaty that he denounced shortly thereafter.

The Congress of Vienna, which addressed the problem of Christian slaves from Barbary piracy, charged the United Kingdom and the Netherlands to negotiate with the Dey of Algiers and the Beys of Tunis and Tripoli. Although the latter two were agreeable, Omar Agha was not. It would take the 9-hour Bombardment of Algiers (1816) on 27 August 1816, by an Anglo-Dutch naval force commanded by British Admiral Lord Exmouth, to compel the Dey to abolish Christian slavery. However, the bombardment of Algiers did not destroy Barbary power. Despite the signing of the treaty and the release of 3,000 Christian slaves, Dey Omar set to rebuilding the city's defences, putting its Jewish inhabitants to forced labour in the place of Christian slaves. Moreover, the problem remained such that it was one of the main areas of contention at the Congress of Aix-la-Chapelle (1818).

Death 
Thanks to the series of defeats, at the hands of Europeans, he was strangled on September 8, 1817, and he was buried within an hour. His successor was Ali ben Ahmed.

References 

 Raïs Hamidou: Le dernier corsaire barbaresque d'Alger  Par Paul Desprès
 La piraterie barbaresque en Méditerranée: XVI-XIXe siècle  Par Roland Courtinat

1817 deaths
Deys of Algiers
1773 births
Algerian people of Greek descent
People from Lesbos